José Angelino Caamal Mena (born 14 February 1961) is a Mexican politician affiliated with the PANAL. As of 2013 he served as Deputy of the LXII Legislature of the Mexican Congress representing Campeche.

References

1961 births
Living people
Politicians from Campeche City
New Alliance Party (Mexico) politicians
21st-century Mexican politicians
Deputies of the LXII Legislature of Mexico
Members of the Chamber of Deputies (Mexico) for Campeche